Áilleacht (or Áilleacht: Beauty) is the sixth studio album from Irish singer Pádraigín Ní Uallacháin, the fifth to be released on the Gael Linn label. The album's central theme is love, with songs mainly written by Ní Uallacháin. Áilleacht was recorded in Teelin, County Donegal.

Fantasy novelist O. R. Melling used verses from both "Gleann na nDeor" (Valley of Tears) and "An Phóg" (The Kiss), in this novel "The Light-Bearer's Daughter".

Track listing

Personnel 
Pádraigín Ní Uallacháin – vocals
Brian Dunning - flute
Iarla Ó Lionáird - vocals
Steve Cooney - guitars
Laoise Kelly – Irish harp

References

External links
 Áilleacht - official website

2005 albums
Pádraigín Ní Uallacháin albums